Yola Airport  is an airport serving Yola, the capital of the Adamawa State of Nigeria.

The airport has night landing capabilities, but for most flights in non-international designated airports, the Federal Airports Authority of Nigeria restricts night operations except for passenger flights during pilgrimage (Hajj).

Airlines and destinations

Statistics 

These data show number of passengers movements into the airport, according to the Federal Airports Authority of Nigeria's Aviation Sector Summary Reports.

See also
Transport in Nigeria
List of airports in Nigeria
List of the busiest airports in Africa

References

External links

OurAirports - Yola
SkyVector - Yola

Airports in Nigeria
Adamawa State